The following is a list of FCC-licensed radio stations in the U.S. state of Michigan, which can be sorted by their call signs, frequencies, cities of license, licensees, and programming formats.

List of radio stations

Defunct
 W8XWJ
 WKPR
 WQLR

References

 
Michigan
Radio